Li Yingli (born 24 December 1997) is a Chinese Paralympic athlete. She is a Paralympic gold medalist and three-time medalist at the World Para Athletics Championships.

Career
Li represented China at the 2016 Summer Paralympics; in the women's 4 × 100 metres relay T35-T38 event she won the gold medal together with Wen Xiaoyan, Chen Junfei and Jiang Fenfen.

References

1997 births
Living people
Paralympic athletes of China
Chinese female discus throwers
Chinese female shot putters
Chinese female sprinters
Paralympic gold medalists for China
Paralympic bronze medalists for China
Athletes (track and field) at the 2016 Summer Paralympics
Athletes (track and field) at the 2020 Summer Paralympics
Medalists at the 2016 Summer Paralympics
Medalists at the 2020 Summer Paralympics
21st-century Chinese women